Peter Valance (born June 4, 1980 in Riedlingen) is a German illusionist.

Career 
He was the youngest winner of all times of the Merlin Award. This award, which is the highest honor in the international magic community, was also given to David Copperfield, Siegfried & Roy and Criss Angel.

When he was only 15 years old he joined the Magic Circle, at 19 he became Germany’s youngest professional magician. Today, he produces and performs in the most elaborate illusion shows in Europe.

Valance produces up to 700 shows per year for cruise ships, casinos, theme parks, TV-productions and company events. In the last 5 years, more than 3 million people attended his shows.

In December 2012 he was part of the German TV-Show "Einfach Magisch", presented from Judith Rakers.

Awards
 2009: Merlin Awards: Best magic show

TV shows
 2012: Einfach Magisch (SF (24. November 2012, 20:10); ARD (17. Dezember 2012, 20:15 Uhr); BR (26. Dezember 2012)
 SAT1 
 VOX "Deutschland sucht den Superstar - Das Magazin"

References

External links 
 Official homepage

1980 births
German magicians
Living people